Ri Sol-ju (born  1985–1989) is the current First Lady of North Korea as the wife of Supreme Leader Kim Jong-un.

Little is known about her from official North Korean sources, but outside sources have speculated more about her background. While she has made many public appearances with her husband, she has also spent long periods out of the public eye. In April 2018, state media had announced that her new title had been elevated from merely "Comrade" to "Respected First Lady" – considered a significant honor and the first time the title has been used since 1974. At the same time, she began to take on a diplomatic role.

Biography
North Korean leader Kim Jong-un and his family have been characterized as "secretive". Very little information about Ri Sol-ju has appeared in official North Korean sources, but more speculative information has been reported in foreign media.

Early life

Very little is known for certain about Ri's origins; some analysts have even said that her name "almost certainly is a pseudonym". Her reported year of birth has ranged between 1985 and 1989. Ri's family is reportedly from the political elite; her mother is the head of a gynecology ward and her father is a professor. She is said to have graduated from Geumsung 2 Middle School in Pyongyang and studied abroad in China, majoring in vocal music. She is said to be related to Ri Pyong-chol, a former general of the Korean People's Army Air and Anti-Air Force and close advisor of Kim Jong-un. JoongAng Ilbo and some commentators have identified Ri as a singer in the Unhasu Orchestra that has made several overseas performances. Reportedly, North Korean officials are "trying to erase her past as a singer and entertainer by confiscating popular bootleg CDs of her performances", such as her singing the song "Sobaeksu". In 2012, she was reportedly a graduate student at Kim Il-sung University, pursuing a PhD in science.

Ri reportedly visited South Korea in 2005, as a member of the North Korean cheerleading team during the Asian Athletics Championships. She was said to be among 90 cheerleaders who chanted "We are one!" Ri reportedly told a South Korean teacher while on the trip: "We want to take classes from the South's teachers after being reunited as soon as possible."

Marriage and children

The BBC, quoting an analyst who spoke to The Korea Times of South Korea, reported that Kim's father, Kim Jong-il, had hastily arranged his son's marriage after suffering a stroke in 2008. The two were reportedly married in 2009.

Ri possibly gave birth to a child in 2010; sources reported it was a boy.

In December 2012, it was reported that Ri was visibly pregnant, although North Korean officials did not comment. In March 2013, former NBA basketball player Dennis Rodman visited Kim Jong-un in North Korea. Rodman told The Guardian in September 2013 that the couple's child, a girl, is named . He said that Jong-un had "a beautiful family" and was a "good dad".

South Korean intelligence officials reported that Ri gave birth to a third child of unknown gender in February 2017.

In November 2022, North Korean state media published photographs of Kim Jong-un holding hands with his young daughter at the site of a missile launch in Pyongyang. While the child was not named, observers believe it is Kim Ju-ae.

First Lady of North Korea
In 2012, Ri made several public appearances standing next to Kim Jong-un, causing speculation about who she might be. South Korean intelligence officials wrongly identified her as Hyon Song-wol, a former singer for the Pochonbo Electronic Ensemble, a musical group popular in North Korea. However, on 25 July 2012, North Korean state media announced that she was actually Kim's wife, saying she was "his wife, Comrade Ri Sol-ju". The announcement of the marriage marked a change from Kim's father Kim Jong-il, who had never introduced his wives to the public.

In July 2012, at an elite gala concert in North Korea, Ri was stylishly "dressed in a trim black suit in the Chanel tradition", considered unusual for North Korean women. Along with other recent changes, such as the firing of a hard-line top general, Kim Jong-un's marriage is seen by analysts as "a continuation of what is either a policy change, or a propaganda offensive, or both".

In September 2012, Kenji Fujimoto, the former personal sushi chef of Kim Jong-il, said he met Ri on a recent trip to North Korea. He described her as "just so charming... I cannot describe her voice, it's so soft..." As a parting gift, Ri gave Fujimoto a Christian Dior handbag, which Ri was earlier reported to have been carrying.

From 2012 to 2014, Ri appeared occasionally in the North Korean media, accompanying her husband to events, but subsequently, she was rarely seen. She had long periods out of the public view in 2015, 2016, and 2017.

In 2018, Ri took on a diplomatic role. In March 2018, she visited China with her husband, meeting China's paramount leader Xi Jinping and his wife, Peng Liyuan. In April 2018, ahead of the April 2018 inter-Korean summit, Ri's title was elevated to "Respected First Lady" (instead of just "Comrade"), the first time since 1974 the title had been used in North Korea; the previous bearer was Kim Il-sung's second wife, Kim Song-ae. The change in title was made public in a news report read by star anchorwoman, Ri Chun-hee, who often makes major announcements. Ri attended the summit, the first wife of a North Korean leader to do so, and met the First Lady of South Korea, Kim Jung-sook, for the first time. The two first ladies were observed as being close to each other during their meetings that year. In May, she met with US diplomats and helped ease tensions. She also helped host the visit of China's paramount leader Xi Jinping and his wife Peng Liyuan in June 2019.

See also

Unhasu Orchestra

References

External links

|-

1980s births
Living people
Kim dynasty (North Korea)
North Korean women singers
21st-century North Korean women politicians
21st-century North Korean politicians
Place of birth missing (living people)
Spouses of North Korean national leaders
Year of birth uncertain
Kim Jong-un
21st-century women singers
Kim Il-sung University alumni